Michael Bullard (born June 12, 1957) is a Canadian stand-up comic and broadcaster. He is the former host of the late-night talk shows Open Mike with Mike Bullard on CTV and The Mike Bullard Show on Global and of the midday radio show, Beyond the Mic with Mike Bullard on CFRB.

Family and early life
Bullard was born in Etobicoke, Ontario, a suburb of Toronto. His father was in retail and his mother was a housewife.

His younger brother is US-based comedian, television writer, host, and producer Pat Bullard and his older half-brother is Downchild Blues Band lead singer Chuck Jackson.

When Bullard was 6, his family moved from Don Mills, Ontario to Galt (now Cambridge, Ontario), later moving to Mississauga.

Career

Stand-up comedy
A resident of Mississauga since he was 14 years old, Bullard worked briefly as a police officer with Peel Regional Police in his youth, but resigned when he was not permitted to moonlight in comedy clubs. He then returned to Bell Canada, where he had worked previously, and eventually was promoted to associate director of corporate investigation, while also working part-time as a stand-up comic. His promotion occurred after his manager saw him perform as an emcee at the Just for Laughs festival, leading him to conclude that if Bullard could handle a crowd he could also handle corporate investigations.

Bullard has a long-time association with the Yuk Yuk's chain of comedy clubs, as both an emcee and headliner, since first appearing at the Toronto club in July 1988. He continues to perform at Yuk Yuk's venues across Ontario to the present day.

Television
His stand-up career led him to becoming the host of Open Mike with Mike Bullard in 1997. The late-night talk variety show is considered the first successful Canadian attempt at the genre. The show aired nightly for six seasons on The Comedy Network and the CTV Television Network and won two Gemini Awards during its run. At its peak, Open Mike had higher Canadian ratings than The Tonight Show with Jay Leno and Late Show with David Letterman. After leaving CTV when his contract expired in 2003, Bullard accused executives at his old network of not supporting the show and of being "dysfunctional", resulting in countercharges of "bitterness" against Bullard who was described as having "burned his bridges" with CTV and the Comedy Network.

In 2003, Bullard was hired away by Global with a multi-year deal to host The Mike Bullard Show in the same timeslot, with much of the same staff and sketches as Open Mike. However, the new show was cancelled on March 12, 2004, after 13 weeks due to poor ratings against The Daily Show with Jon Stewart which CTV aired against Bullard's new show.

Radio
Following his television show's cancellation, Bullard resumed his career as a stand-up comic playing in comedy clubs such as Yuk Yuk's, released a comedy CD, did commercials for a weight loss clinic, and made a cameo appearance at the Gemini Awards taking part in a skit in which he played a corpse protesting "I'm not dead yet!" while paramedics removed him from the stage. In October 2006, Bullard launched an uncensored morning satellite radio show on XM Canada's Laugh Attack channel; the program was cancelled after five months.

Bullard returned to TV to host HouseCapades, a real estate series depicting the lighter side of selling one's home, in 2006. In August 2009, Bullard became the host of The Mike Bullard Show on Talk820 Radio (CHAM-AM) in Hamilton, Ontario, however his evening show was cancelled when CHAM switched to a country music format in July 2010.

From 2010 to 2016, Bullard hosted Beyond the Mic with Mike Bullard weekdays at noon on Newstalk 1010 in Toronto.

He returned to broadcasting in October 2018 on Sauga 960 AM in Mississauga as host with Lawrence Morganstern of the afternoon drive time show, The Getaway. The show ceased production in late January 2019.

From 2019 to 2020, Bullard hosted a podcast, You Too with Mike Bullard.

Humanitarian work in Ukraine

In November 2022, during the 2022 Russian invasion of Ukraine, Bullard went to Ukraine to volunteer with humanitarian organizations and document the impact of the crisis on civilians, remaining there until February 2023.

Bullard says he is haunted by one incident in Dnipro that he witnessed shortly after arriving, where Russian military hit an apartment block with missiles. While workers were digging through the rubble, two search dogs pinpointed one spot. After he and rescuers kept digging, the bodies of two children were pulled out from underneath the pieces of building.

“They looked to be about maybe seven and five, and one of them had pyjamas on. They were both dead,” Bullard told the Toronto Star. “I cried myself to sleep every night for a week.”

In another incident, he said, he helped clean out a house hit by ordnance that killed a man in his twenties. The pillow was bloodstained and had pieces of brain stuck to it. The man’s widow and mother-in-law moved back in after they finished.

Bullard decided to return to Canada, due to the high cost of medical care in Ukraine, after surviving an accident in which a car he was riding in was hit by a bus.

Legal issues
Bell Media, which owns CFRB, severed ties with Bullard on October 5, 2016, after he was charged with criminal harassment of his ex-girlfriend, Cynthia Mulligan. In 2017 and 2018, he was charged with several counts of allegedly breaching bail conditions and additional charges of obstructing justice for allegedly trying to get Mulligan to have the initial charges dropped.

On October 30, 2018, the Toronto Star published a "correction" retracting an earlier report that Bullard had been spotted at Mulligan's home in violation of a court order that he stay away from her. The newspaper's correction stated "In fact,... the charges do not state that he was at her home and those allegations were not raised in any subsequent court proceedings. The criminal harassment charge against Bullard was dismissed at the preliminary inquiry on June 1, 2018."
 
On June 8, 2018, Bullard pleaded guilty to one count of harassing communication for making harassing phone calls to Mulligan and two counts of violating his bail conditions by contacting her through a third party. He was given a conditional discharge, put on six months of probation and was required to attend a domestic violence program. His criminal harassment and obstruction of justice charges had been dropped earlier in the month after the judge ruled there was no reasonable prospect of conviction.

Bullard launched a legal action for defamation in August 2018 against Chatelaine magazine, one of its writers, and its publisher, Rogers Media, asking for $6 million in damages after it published an interview with Cynthia Mulligan. The suit alleged the article incorrectly claimed that Bullard had been found guilty of "stalking / criminal harassment" and  had resulted in Bullard being subjected "to ridicule, hatred, and contempt" and caused damage to his professional and personal reputations by implying that he is "unfit for employment and/or intimate relationships".

On May 20, 2020, Bullard's lawsuit was dismissed by the court following a motion by the defence that the lawsuit violated Ontario's anti-SLAPP legislation. Ontario Superior Court Justice Michael McKelvey ruled: "What is clear in this case is that the damage to Mr. Bullard's career and reputation occurred well prior to and independent of the publication of the Chatelaine article. What is also clear is that the comments of his victim are views one could honestly hold based on the proven facts, and form part of a public dialogue on a matter of significant public interest."

According to a 2023 Toronto Star profile, Bullard is unrepentant when talking about the case, speaking in a tense and stern tone "sometimes drifting into anger" with Bullard asserting he was treated unfairly by the media, public and the prosecutors. Bullard says the case has affected his career causing him to slide from public view, though he still works regularly as a stand-up comic at Yuk Yuk's.

Awards
Mike Bullard has won two Gemini Awards for Open Mike With Mike Bullard, Best Talk Information Series in 1999 and Best Music Variety Program Series in 2001. The show also won the 2000 Hugo Award (Gold Medal) for Best Talk Show at the Chicago International Television Festival. Bullard was voted one of the top 10 Funniest Canadians in a nationwide poll by TV Guide in 2002.

In 2013, he received the Queen's Diamond Jubilee Medal for his volunteer work,  including supporting charities such as the Trillium Health Foundation and the Juvenile Diabetes Foundation and emceeing many charitable fundraisers.

References

External links
 

1957 births
Living people
Canadian male comedians
Canadian talk radio hosts
Canadian television talk show hosts
Comedians from Toronto
People from Etobicoke
Canadian stand-up comedians
20th-century Canadian comedians
21st-century Canadian comedians